Eugoa gemina is a moth of the family Erebidae. It is found in Ghana.

References

 Natural History Museum Lepidoptera generic names catalog

Endemic fauna of Ghana
gemina
Moths described in 1914